Ma Yueliang or Ma Yueh-liang  (1 August 1901 – 13 March 1998)  was a famous Manchu teacher of taijiquan. He was the senior disciple of Wu Chien-ch'uan, the founder of Wu-style taijiquan, and married Wu's daughter Wu Ying-hua in 1930.

Biography
Ma Yueliang was also a medical doctor who graduated from the Beijing Medical College in 1929 and specialized in Hematology. He established the First Medical Examination and Experiment Office and ran the blood clinics at Zhong Shan Hospital in Shanghai. Like Wu Ch'uan-yu and Wu Chien-ch'uan, Ma was of Manchu descent. Ma was educated both in the traditions of China and in Western science.

There are accounts that Ma was a gifted martial artist in his youth. He had studied a number of martial arts including, Shaolinquan, Three Emperors Pao Chui, Baguazhang and Tongbeiquan. However, Wu Jianquan would accept Ma as a student only if he concentrated on Wu-style taijiquan. From about age 18, Ma exclusively studied Wu-style taijiquan. Wu Jianquan started the Jianquan Taijiquan Association (鑑泉太極拳社) in Shanghai in 1936, and Ma became the deputy director of the Association. Ma studied Taijiquan with Wu Chien-ch'uan until the death of his teacher in 1942. The Jianquan Association still exists today internationally and remains a resource for the study of Wu-style taijiquan.

It is difficult to overstate the importance of Ma Yueliang and his wife in the emergence of Wu-style taijiquan after the Cultural Revolution in China. Even at an advanced age, Ma was chosen as one of the 100 Best Martial Artists in China. Wu Ying-hua and Ma continued to teach in Taijiquan until their deaths. They taught a large number of students in Shanghai and in their travels to New Zealand, Germany and elsewhere. They published several books on Wu-style taijiquan, including the "Orange Book" relied upon today by Wu-stylists throughout the world. Ma and Wu Ying-hua's Wu-style sword/weapons book includes a family picture with several of their closest students. Ma Yueliang also publicly practiced a number of formerly closed door (private or family secret) forms and methods so that they would not be lost. In public, Wu Ying-hua would often demonstrate the Wu style Slow Set and Ma would follow by demonstrating the Wu Style Tai Chi Fast Form. Ma taught many high level students, including Xie Bing Can, and Fei Gua-ching who is still active in the Jianquan Taijiquan Association in Shanghai. Li Li-Qun is one of Grandmaster Ma's oldest and closest living students.  He was the deputy vice-secretary of the Jianquan Association (Chien Chuan Association) in Shanghai under masters Ma and his wife Wu Ying Hua.

Ma Yueliang and Wu Ying-hua are survived by their children and grandchildren, including: Ma Jiangchun (b. 1931), Dr. Ma Hailong (b. 1935), Ma Jiang Bao (b. 1941, d. 2016) and Ma Jiangling (b. 1947). Ma Jiang Bao lived in the Netherlands and taught traditional Taijiquan throughout Europe. Their adopted daughter Shi Mei Lin now lives and teaches Wu-style taijiquan in New Zealand. She also has students in France and in the United States (Tucson, Arizona).

References

Bibliography
Wu Kung-tsao. Wu Family T'ai Chi Ch'uan (吳家太極拳) Hong Kong 1980, Toronto 2006, 
 Wu Ying Hua, Ma Yueh Liang, Shi Mei Lin (1987). Wu Style Tai Chi Fast Form. Henan Science Skills Ltd. Henan (only available in Chinese) /G122.
 Wu Ying Hua, Ma Yueh Liang, Shi Mei Lin (1991). Wu Style Tai Chi Fast Form. Shanghai Book Co Ltd, Hong Kong (only available in Chinese) . .
 Wu Ying Hua, Ma Yueh Liang (1993). Wu Style Tai Chi Chuan Forms, Concepts and Application of the Original Style. Shanghai Book Co Ltd, Hong Kong. .
 Ma Yueh Liang & Zee Wen (1986, 1990, 1995). Wu Style Tai Chi Chuan Push Hands. Shanghai Book Co Ltd, Hong Kong. .
 Dr Zee Wen (2002) Wu Style Tai Chi Chuan, Ancient Chinese way to health. North Atlantic Books. .

T'ai chi ch'uan lineage tree with Wu-style focus

External links
Google video of Ma Yueliang performing Wu style fast form
QuickTime movie of Ma Yueliang performing 13 posture spear form

 by Bill Moyers

Ma Jiang-bao's Traditional Wu style Taijiquan website
Wu style Taijiquan website: Shanghai

1901 births
1998 deaths
Chinese tai chi practitioners
Manchu martial artists